Segorodsky is a rural locality (a settlement) in Limannoye Rural Settlement, Pallasovsky District, Volgograd Oblast, Russia. The population was 287 as of 2010. There are 7 streets.

Geography 
Segorodsky is located in steppe, 20 km southeast of Pallasovka (the district's administrative centre) by road. Pallasovka is the nearest rural locality.

References 

Rural localities in Pallasovsky District